The Château de La Besse is a château in Milhac-d'Auberoche, Dordogne, Nouvelle-Aquitaine, France.

Châteaux in Dordogne